Murliganj is a town and a notified area in Madhepura district in the Indian state of Bihar. PIN code of Murliganj is 852122.

Geography 
It has an average elevation of 52 m. It situated on the east boundary of Madhepura.

Demographics 
 India census, Murliganj had a population of 22,921. Males constitute 53% of the population and females 47%. Murliganj has an average literacy rate of 45%, lower than the national average of 59.5%: male literacy is 53%, and female literacy is 37%. In Murliganj, 19% of the population is under 6 years of age.

References 

Cities and towns in Madhepura district